Death Is My Business is a 2011 Iranian drama film directed by Amir Hossein Saghafi.

Cast
 Pejman Bazeghi
 Amir Aghai
 Kamran Tafti
 Maryam Boubani
 Mahchehreh Khalili
 Akbar Sangi
 Meysam Ghanizadeh
 Sonia Espahram

References

External links
 

2011 films
2011 drama films
2010s Persian-language films
2011 directorial debut films
Iranian drama films